Shallcross is a suburb of Durban, South Africa.

Gang activity
Shallcross experienced intermittent gang violence from 2019 to 2021. In January 2021 Yaganathan “Teddy Mafia” Pillay became the 8th victim in an ongoing turf war over drug distribution and sales. A relative of Pillay alleged that the police had failed to arrest any of the killers, and may have been bribed. In one of several drive-by shootings following these murders, a 52 year old man was killed on 8 March in Taurus street.

References

Suburbs of Durban